Jean-Pierre Bastiat (11 April 1949 – 3 February 2021) was a French international rugby union player. He played as a Lock and Number 8 for US Dax.

Bastiat was born in Pouillon, Landes. As a youngster, Bariet played basketball. He earned his first cap with the French national team on 14 December 1969 against Romania at Colombes. He won the 1970 and 1973 Five Nations Championships, as well as the Grand Slam in the 1977 Five Nations Championship. The next year he captained France replacing the retired Jacques Fouroux. He retired in 1978 due to a knee injury. In total, Bastiat made 32 appearances for France between 1969 and 1978.

He died on 3 February 2021, following a stroke.

Honours 
 Selected to represent France, 1969–1979
 French rugby champion finalist 1973 with US Dax
 Grand Slam: 1977
 Five Nations Championship:1970

References

External links
 Jean-Pierre Bastiat International Statistics

French rugby union players
France international rugby union players
US Dax players
Rugby union locks
Rugby union number eights
US Dax executives
1949 births
2021 deaths